Sebastian Cristian Cojocnean  (born 11 July 1989) is a Romanian footballer who plays as a midfielder. Cojocnean began his football career at Gloria Bistrița II and during the summer of 2004 he was transferred to Otopeni.

Cojocnean has played in several Romanian national youth teams, up to and including U-21 level. Since his debut he was monitored by many powerful clubs in the Romanian Liga I and from abroad. The player signed a 3-year contract with Politehnica Timișoara in September 2007, after a two-month-long delay, during which he was conflicted with the management at Otopeni.

CS Otopeni received around EUR 400.000 for the player

External links
 
 

1989 births
Living people
People from Câmpia Turzii
Romanian footballers
Association football midfielders
Liga I players
Liga II players
Cypriot First Division players
Cypriot Second Division players
CS Otopeni players
FC Sportul Studențesc București players
LPS HD Clinceni players
FC Gloria Buzău players
FC Universitatea Cluj players
FC Petrolul Ploiești players
CS Gaz Metan Mediaș players
FC Rapid București players
A.C. Monza players
Ethnikos Achna FC players
Enosis Neon Paralimni FC players
CS Pandurii Târgu Jiu players
Romanian expatriate footballers
Romanian expatriate sportspeople in Cyprus
Expatriate footballers in Cyprus
Romanian expatriate sportspeople in Italy
Expatriate footballers in Italy